Noel Entwistle (born in 1936) is a UK educational psychologist who has made significant contributions to theories of student learning in higher education.  He is particularly known for identifying the characteristics of, and influences on, deep and surface approaches to learning, and developing the Approaches to Studying Inventory  (Entwistle & Ramsden, 1983) and the Approaches and Study Skills Inventory for Students (Entwistle, McCune & Tait, 2013). He also developed, with Ference Marton, the idea of 'knowledge objects' as structured understandings developed by students as they prepare for exams or writing essays (Entwistle & Marton, 1994). Entwistle was formerly editor of the British Journal of Education Psychology and also of the international journal Higher Education. He is a fellow of the British Psychological Society, has an Oeuvre Award from the European Association for Research in Learning and Instruction, and Honorary Doctorates from the universities of Gothenburg and Turku. He has published many articles in academic journals related to both educational psychology and teaching and learning in higher education, as well as several books including Styles of Learning and Teaching (1981), Understanding Student Learning (1983), Understanding Classroom Learning (1987), and Teaching for Understanding at University (2009).

See also
Ference Marton

Notes

External links
Brief bio of Noel Entwistle

References
Entwistle, N. J. (2009).Teaching for Understanding at University: Deep Approaches and Distinctive Ways of Thinking. 
Basingstoke, Hampshire: Palgrave Macmillan.
Entwistle, N. J. (2012). The quality of learning at university: Integrative understanding and distinctive ways of thinking. In J. R. Kirby & M. J. Lawson (Eds.), Enhancing the Quality of Learning (pp. 15–31). New York: Cambridge University Press.
Entwistle, N. J. & Entwistle, D. M. (2003). The interplay between memorising and understanding in preparing for examinations. Higher Education Research and Development, 22, 19-42
Entwistle, N. J. and Marton, F. (1994). Knowledge objects: understandings constituted through intensive academic study. British Journal of Educational Psychology, 64,161-78.
Entwistle, N. J. and McCune, V. (2004). The conceptual bases of study strategy inventories. Educational Psychology Review, 16,325-45.
Entwistle, N. J., McCune, V. and Tait, H. (2013). Approaches and Study Skills Inventory for Students: Report of the Development of the Inventories posted at <http://www.etl.tla.ed.ac.uk/questionnaires/ASSIST.pdf> (last accessed 30/3/2014).

Educational psychologists
Living people
1936 births